Hasora anura, the slate awl, is a species of hesperid butterfly found in Asia. In India it is found in Sikkim and the Khasi Hills.

Range
In India the butterfly ranges from Mussoorie eastwards to Sikkim, the Shan states in Myanmar, Thailand, south-west and central China (Yunnan).

The type locality is Sikkim.

Status
William Harry Evans (1932) described the species as rare.

Description

Edward Yerbury Watson (1891)  gives a detailed description, shown below:

Cited references

See also
Coeliadinae
Hesperiidae
List of butterflies of India (Coeliadinae)
List of butterflies of India (Hesperiidae)

References

Print

Watson, E. Y. (1891) Hesperiidae indicae. Vest and Co. Madras.

Online

Brower, Andrew V. Z., (2007). Hasora Moore 1881. Version 21 February 2007 (under construction). Page on genus Hasora in The Tree of Life Web Project http://tolweb.org/.

Hasora
Butterflies described in 1889
Butterflies of Asia
Taxa named by Lionel de Nicéville